was a town located in Kitauwa District, Ehime Prefecture, Japan.

As of 2003, the town had an estimated population of 6,562 and a density of 115.30 persons per km². The total area was 56.91 km².

On August 1, 2005, Mima, along with the towns of Tsushima and Yoshida (all from Kitauwa District), was merged into the expanded city of Uwajima.

External links
Uwajima official website in Japanese
Memoirs of a Teacher - a visiting English teacher in Mima in English

Dissolved municipalities of Ehime Prefecture
Uwajima, Ehime